John Celivergos Zachos (December 20, 1820 – March 20, 1898) was a Greek-American physician, literary scholar, elocutionist, author, lecturer, inventor, and educational pioneer.  He was an early proponent of equal education rights for African Americans and women.  He advocated and expanded the Oratory systems of François Delsarte and James Rush.

Early life
Zachos was born in Constantinople, the capital of the Ottoman Empire. His parents were Nicholas and Euphrosyne Zachos. They were from Athens. Nicholas Zachos was a general in the Greek army during the Greek War of Independence, where he was killed in battle in 1824.

Samuel Gridley Howe an American surgeon and Philhellene was also fighting for Greek independence.  He brought John Celivergos Zachos along with other young Greek people back to the United States to educate them.

Namely traveling with Zachos and Howe was a young refugee who survived the Chios massacre named Christophoros Castanes.  In 1851, he wrote a book on his travels called The Greek Exile, Or, a Narrative of the Captivity and Escape of Christophorus Plato Castanis. This book includes John C. Zachos and other Greek children.

Education and marriage

In 1830, Zachos was in the United States.  He was placed in Mount Pleasant Classical Institute in Amherst Massachusetts with Christophorus P. Castanis and other Greek children. Their instructors were Gregory Anthony Perdicaris and Petros Mengous and the assistant principal and founder was Chauncey Colton D. D. Zachos later traveled to an Episcopalian institution twenty miles north of Philadelphia.  Bristol Manual Labor College, Dr Colton was the founder and President it combined manual labor and study.  He remained there from 1833 to 1836.

By 1837 Zachos again followed Dr. Colton to Kenyon College in Gambier Ohio.  Chauncey Colton D. D. took a position as Professor of Homiletics at the institution.  Zachos classmates included Rutherford B. Hayes and Stanley Matthews. He graduated from the institution by 1840 with honors.  Zachos gave two commencement speeches one was in Classical Greek and the other was in English.  As a young adult, he was noted for fine speaking, he won prizes whenever he competed.  He was the founder of the Society of Kenyon College.
  
By now, Zachos and Matthews were close friends and the two lived together in Cincinnati, Matthews's hometown.  Matthews pursued a law degree under Salmon P. Chase and Zachos was a Teacher, while he continued a graduate Degree at Kenyon College.  Colton also traveled to Cincinnati.  He founded a few schools where Professor Zachos also taught.

By 1843, Zachos finished his second degree from Kenyon College.  By now Zachos enrolled in Medical School under the
prominent Dr. Reuben D. Mussey where he continued his studies for three years.  By the late 1840s, Zachos decide not to practice medicine due to his love for teaching and literature.

Zachos, Stanley Matthews (judge), Ainsworth Rand Spofford, and nine others founded the Literary Club of Cincinnati in 1849.  One year later Rutherford B. Hayes became a member. Other prominent members included William Howard Taft and notable club guests Ralph Waldo Emerson, Booker T. Washington, Mark Twain, and Robert Frost.

He married Harriet Tompkins Canfield Zachos on July 26, 1849.
Harriet Tompkins was born on January 15, 1824, to George Washington Canfield and Catherine A Clark.  Harriet's second cousin John Caldwell Canfield married Ella Todd, Abraham Lincoln's niece.  Harriet Canfield and John Zachos had 6 children.  Born between 1850 to 1865. His daughter Mary Helena Zachos became an American college professor and elocutionist.  His son Ainsworth was named after close friend and Abolitionist Ainsworth Rand Spofford.

Middle years
By 1850, Zachos was the co-owner and principal of the Cincinnati Female Seminary on the southeast corner of Ninth and Walnut.  The school was founded by Miss Margaret Coxe in 1843.  Together they were also co-principals of Cooper Female Institute in Dayton Ohio.

Zachos was very active in Ohio during the 1850s.  He was involved with the Ohio State Teachers Association and created the Association for Advancement of Female Education.
Zachos was also the editor of the Ohio Journal of Education.

During the early 1850s Zachos wrote several books: The New American Speaker and Introductory Lessons in Reading and Elocution.

Educator Horace Mann, a fellow Bostonian and close friend to Samuel Gridley Howe, took a position at Antioch College in Yellow Springs, Ohio.  Mann invited Zachos to the college.  Zachos became a principal of the preparatory school in 1854 but remained at the post for three years because Mann could not secure his tenure.  At Antioch College, Zachos read Shakespeare and lectured courses on the English Poets.  During his time at the institution, Zachos stayed busy traveling around Ohio with his many other organizations.

By 1857 Zachos moved back to Cincinnati he took random teaching jobs and wrote four more books before the onset of the Civil war. The Primary School Speaker, The High School Speaker, The Analytic and Phonetic Word Book and Analytic Elocution.  At this point Zachos was perfecting public speech and education.

American Civil War
At the onset of the Civil War, Zachos was summoned by close friend Salmon P. Chase to go to Port Royal.  He was formally sent by the Boston and New York Education Commissions to prove the former slaves could be educated.  On March 13, 1862, Zachos was on Parris Island in command of 400 freed slaves on a plantation.  Zachos spent a total of 16 months at Parris Island.  Zachos took on many roles during this time, he was an Army Surgeon, Teacher, Store Keeper.  The military stronghold was supervised by Zachos under General Rufus Saxton.   He is noted for writing and reciting poetry to the freed slaves.

Ye sons of burning Afric's soil,
Lift up your hands of hardened toil
Your shouts from every hill recoil
Today you are free

Zachos left Parris Island towards the end of 1863 to conclude the experiment.  While he was at Port Royal he studied the difficulties former slaves encountered with learning how to read.  Namely, older slaves had a hard time due to years of torture and psychological abuse.

Zachos traveled back to Boston. He lived in the neighborhood where he grew up and where Samuel Gridley Howe still maintained a residence.  During the beginning of 1864, Zachos assembled a group of uneducated immigrants, both male and female.  The test subjects did not speak or read English.

Zachos, with the knowledge he acquired from the former slaves, put together a curriculum to instruct the test subjects.  Because he did not have a book he used charts and the chalkboard.  The students had to wait until March 1864 to receive the first book which had an extremely long title  The Phonic Primer and Reader, A National Method of teaching Reading by the Sounds of the Letters without altering the Orthography. Designed Chiefly for the Use of Night-Schools Where Adults are Taught, and for the Myriads of Freed Men and Women, Whose First Rush from the Prison-House of Slavery is to the Gates of the Temple of Knowledge.

The test concluded that the new technique he created during his time at Port Royal was effective enough to teach adults. It was a simple teaching method.  The method employed a unique phonic education technique of teaching English reading by sounds of letters.  That same year an official book was published to educate the former adult slaves.  Phonic Primer and Reader.  Thus was coined the phrase: The Port Royal Experiment. After his work Salmon P. Chase gave Zachos an extraordinary recommendation.

Career and later life
Another notable Greek American abolitionist was a resident of Boston around this period.  His name was Chaplain Photius Fisk.  Zachos continued living in Boston for another two years. He became a Unitarian Minister.  He gave twelve lectures at the Lowell Institute.  Both Samuel Gridley Howe and Zachos Departed Boston at around the same time. Samuel Gridley Howe traveled back to Greece to carry relief to the Cretan refugees and Zachos moved to Meadville Lombard Theological School.

In May 1866, he became the Professor of Sacred Rhetoric.  While at the Theological School he established another Literary Society.  American author, historian, and Unitarian minister Edward Everett Hale spoke very highly of John C. Zachos. By 1868 Zachos moved to Ithaca, New York to the Ithaca Chapter of the Theological Seminary.  He remained associated with the former institution until 1871.  While at Ithaca Zachos also lectured and taught classes at the newly founded Cornell University.

In 1871, now 51 he moved to New York City where he would stay until the time of his death.  Peter Cooper and John C. Zachos became good friends. 
Zachos influenced the foundation of Cooper Union.  He taught literature and public speech.  In 1876 he was Peter Cooper's first biographer.  He was a Professor and Library Curator at Cooper Union.

Zachos invented a medical device called an Improvement to Abdominal & Spinal Supporters.  A patent was filed on July 16, 1872. The No. was 129202.  The device was also patented in England.

Due to his legendary reputation in the Civil War as an Army Surgeon. Zachos also became medical advisor to the Butler Health Lift.  He collaborated with the inventor of exercise equipment David Butler.  Together they wrote the instructional books on health and exercise and the benefit of using the equipment.

On December 24, 1875 he filed patent number 175892 for typewriters and phenotypic notation application. The machine was a stenotype used for printing legible English text at a high speed.  He obtained 10,000 dollars in investment capital for his invention.  He continued his advancement of oratory the next two decades.

He was a proponent of the Delsarte System of Oratory founded by François Delsarte.  He also advocated the James Rush classic, The Philosophy of the Human Voice.  James Rush was the son of Benjamin Rush.

Zachos's lectures were very popular at Cooper Union.  Namely, on Tuesdays and Saturdays, the crowd would exceed 100 to 200 people.  Peter Cooper told William Cullen Bryant to personally observe Professor Zachos's lecture.  In "The Letters of William Cullen Bryant" Bryant called Zachos an oratory genius.   Due to his poetry lectures he also gained the recognition of Ralph Waldo Emerson and James Russell Lowell.

His writing was not confined to literature.  Zachos also wrote about philosophy, mathematics, science, metaphysics, and other scientific branches.  Under the pseudonym "Cadmus" Dr. Zachos wrote about financial and economic subjects that were published in various New York City publications.

On January 7, 1896, Harriet Tompkins Zachos died.  Roughly two years later on March 20, 1898, John Celivergos Zachos died.  His funeral was held at the Church of the Messiah (Manhattan).  Among the many in attendance were his pallbearers S. Packard, Augustus D. Juilliard Former NYC mayor William Lafayette Strong and Union army brevet brigadier general Henry Lawrence Burnett.  At the time of his death, his residence was 113 west 84th street New York City.

Literary works
New American Speaker 1851
Introductory Lessons in Reading and Elocution 1852
The Primary School Speaker 1858
The High School Speaker 1858
The Analytic and Phonetic Word Book 1859
Analytic Elocution 1860
The Phonic Primer and Reader A National Method of teaching Reading by the Sounds of the Letters without altering the Orthography. Designed Chiefly for the Use of Night-Schools Where Adults are Taught, and for the Myriads of Freed Men and Women, Whose First Rush from the Prison-House of Slavery is to the Gates of the Temple of Knowledge  March 1864
Phonic Primer and Reader 1864
A Sketch of the Life and Opinions of Mr. Peter Cooper 1876,
The Political and Financial Opinions of Peter Cooper Edited by J.C. Zachos,
An Address to the Merchants and Professional Men of the Country, without Respect to Parties (1878)
The Fiscal Problem of All Civilized Nations (1881)

See also
 George Colvocoresses
 Garafilia Mohalbi

Further reading
 John C. Zachos Lectures and Practice Lessons in three departments of English Literature, Elocution and Composition (Boston Printed by Rand Avery and Frye, 1870).

Bibliography

References

1820 births
1898 deaths
People from Constantinople
American Unitarians
Antioch College faculty
American educational theorists
Kenyon College alumni
Constantinopolitan Greeks
Cooper Union faculty
Greek emigrants to the United States
Union Army soldiers
American abolitionists
American surgeons
19th-century Greek Americans
19th-century Greek scientists
19th-century Greek educators
19th-century Greek physicians
19th-century Greek writers
19th-century Greek American writers
Writers from Istanbul
Academics from Istanbul
Physicians from Istanbul